The 1991 FIVB Men's World Cup was held from 22 November to 1 December 1991 in Japan. The World Cup consisted of 12 teams: champions of 5 geographic areas (Asia, North America, South America, Africa, Europe), the four runners-up, the host country and two guest teams (wild card).

Qualification

Results
All times are Japan Standard Time (UTC+09:00).

First round

Pool A

|}

Location: Osaka

|}

Location: Hiroshima

|}

Pool B

|}

Location: Gifu

|}

Location: Matsumoto

|}

Final round
The results and the points of the matches between the same teams that were already played during the first round are taken into account for the final round.

7th–12th places
Location: Tokyo

|}

|}

Final places
Location: Tokyo

|}

|}

Final standing

Awards

 Most Valuable Player
  Dmitry Fomin
 Best Spiker
  Dmitry Fomin
 Best Blocker
  Bryan Ivie
 Best Server
  Raúl Diago

 Best Setter
  Shin Young-chul
 Best Receiver
  Noh Jin-soo
 Best Digger
  Uvaldo Acosta

References

1991 Men's
Men's World Cup